Her story may refer to:

 Her Story (film), a 1920 silent film
 "Her Story", an episode of the TV series Scrubs (2004)
 "Her Story II", an episode of the TV series Scrubs
 Her Story: Scenes from a Lifetime, a 2005 compilation album by Wynonna Judd
 Her Story (video game), a 2015 interactive movie video game
 Her Story (web series), of 2016 about transgender women

See also
 Herstory, a neologism
Her Stories, a 1995 book by Virginia Hamilton
 Herstory (film), a 2018 film